Land Air Sea is the third album by The Special Goodness. It was originally released in February 2003 by N.O.S. Recordings and a remastered, remixed, and re-ordered edition was released on Epitaph Records on January 20, 2004. The original N.O.S. version had three different covers while the Epitaph version just has one. Patrick Wilson considers this to be his "first true release" despite it being the third official Special Goodness album.

Personnel
Patrick Wilson appears on vocals, guitars and bass and Atom Willard appears on drums. On this album, Wilson worked with many in-studio personnel that often worked with Weezer. The album was mixed by Pinkerton mixer Joe Barresi, who also mixed the band's Christmas EP Winter Weezerland. The band self-produced the album along with Chad Bamford, who engineered Maladroit and received a co-producing credit for Make Believe.

Track listing

2003 N.O.S. version
"Pardon Me"
"Life Goes By"
"Day In The Autumn"
"N.F.A."
"Oops"
"Inside Your Heart"
"Pay No Mind"
"Whatever's Going On"
"In The Sun"
"Move It Along"
"The Big Idea"
"You Know I'd Like..."

2004 Epitaph version
"You Know I'd Like..."
"Life Goes By"
"Day In The Autumn"
"N.F.A."
"Oops"
"The Big Idea"
"Whatever's Going On"
"In The Sun"
"Pardon Me"
"Inside Your Heart"
"Move It Along"
"Pay No Mind"

References

External links
 

2004 albums
The Special Goodness albums